The SouthWest Connection (stylized The South ★ West Connection) is the studio album by American hip hop group C.W.B. (Crazy White Boyz), composed of Nashville rappers Haystak and Lexx Luger, and Oakland rapper Dutch the Great. It was released on May 2, 2006, through Paid in Full Entertainment with distribution via Koch Records. The album features guest appearances from A-Wax, C.G., Coz Pacino, JellyRoll and Smigg Dirtee among others.

Track listing

References

External links
The South West Connection on Apple Music
The South ★ West Connection at Discogs

2006 albums
Haystak albums
E1 Music albums
Collaborative albums